The EDGE of Existence programme is a research and conservation initiative that focuses on species deemed to be the world’s most "Evolutionarily Distinct and Globally Endangered" (EDGE). Developed by the Zoological Society of London (ZSL), the programme aims to raise awareness of these species, implement targeted research and conservation actions to halt their decline, and to train in-country conservationists (called EDGE Fellows) to protect them.

Conserving EDGE species 
The EDGE of Existence programme is centred on an interactive website that features information on the top 100 EDGE mammals, reptiles, birds, amphibians and top 25 EDGE corals, detailing their specific conservation requirements. Each of the top 100 species is given an 'EDGE-ometer' rating according to the degree of conservation attention they are currently receiving, as well as its perceived rarity in its natural environment. 70% of the mammals which have been chosen are receiving little or no conservation attention according to the inventors.

EDGE Fellows 
EDGE research and conservation is carried out by ZSL researchers, a network of partner organizations and local scientists. An important part of the EDGE programme is a fellowship scheme which provides funding and support to local scientists. EDGE Fellows participate in all phases of a research project. Each project is focused on delivering a conservation action plan. Once the action plan is completed, a meeting is held to make additions and corrections to the document.

References

External links 
EDGE of Existence website
ZSL−Zoological Society of London website

.
Endangered species
Environmental research
Zoological Society of London